"The quality of mercy" is a speech given by Portia in William Shakespeare's The Merchant of Venice (Act 4, Scene 1). In the speech, Portia, disguised as a lawyer, begs Shylock to show mercy to Antonio. The speech extols the power of mercy, "an attribute to God Himself."

Critical commentary
Portia, disguised as young lawyer Balthazar, begs Shylock for mercy after travelling from the fictional town of Belmont to Venice. Mercy and forgiveness are recurring themes in Shakespeare. According to Theodore Meron, Shakespeare presented mercy as a quality valuable to the most powerful people in a society.

Harold Fisch argued that the words of  “My doctrine shall drop as the rain, my speech shall distil as the dew; as the small rain upon the tender grass, and as the showers upon the herb,” were echoed in the first words of the speech, “The quality of mercy is not strained. / It droppeth as the gentle rain from heaven / Upon the place beneath.”

Julia Louis-Dreyfus performed the first two sentences in her acceptance speech at the 2018 Mark Twain Prize in the character of Elaine Benes from the Seinfeld TV Series.

Notes

All references to The Merchant of Venice, unless otherwise specified, are taken from the Folger Shakespeare Library's Folger Digital Editions texts edited by Barbara Mowat, Paul Werstine, Michael Poston, and Rebecca Niles. Under their referencing system, 3.1.55 means act 3, scene 1, line 55. Prologues, epilogues, scene directions, and other parts of the play that are not a part of character speech in a scene, are referenced using Folger Through Line Number: a separate line numbering scheme that includes every line of text in the play.

Further reading

Shakespearean phrases
The Merchant of Venice